Lars Ricken (born 10 July 1976) is a German retired footballer who played as a midfielder. Since 2008, he has been a youth coordinator at Borussia Dortmund.

He represented Borussia Dortmund during his entire professional career, which spanned 15 years, being the youngest player to ever appear for the club in an official match, a record later broken by Nuri Şahin.

A German international for five years, Ricken represented the country at the 2002 World Cup and the 1999 Confederations Cup.

Football career
Born in Dortmund, Ricken joined local BV Borussia at an early age, and made his Bundesliga debut on 8 March 1994 in a 1–2 home defeat against VfB Stuttgart, aged not yet 18. From the following season onwards, he became a regular.

Ricken scored a memorable long-distance goal in the final of the 1996–97 edition of the UEFA Champions League  against Juventus F.C., which stood as the fastest in a final of the competition by a substitute, finding the net after just 16 seconds on the field. He also contributed with 8 goals in 47 matches in the team's back-to-back national titles (1994–96).

In the following years, Ricken's success was hampered by a series of injuries. He gained his first cap for Germany on 10 September 1997, in a 1998 FIFA World Cup qualifier against Armenia, but missed that major international tournament as well as UEFA Euro 2000. Later, he restored his form, helping Dortmund to claim the league title in 2002 by scoring a career-best six goals and being selected by national coach Rudi Völler for the squad at that year's World Cup; he did not play in the competition, however, as Germany emerged runners-up.

Ricken's injury woes returned after the World Cup and, as a consequence, he failed to earn recognition at both European or international level. In early April 2007, he was demoted to the reserve team by manager Thomas Doll, due to substandard performance.

In November 2007, Ricken announced his retirement from football. In an attempt to return to football, he briefly attended a training camp in February 2008 with the Columbus Crew of the Major League Soccer, but returned to Germany and Dortmund after a few days.

On 11 June 2008, Borussia Dortmund sport director Michael Zorc, also a former club footballer, announced that Ricken was to be hired as youth coordinator with immediate effect, while still appearing for the amateur side in Regionalliga West. However, on 16 February 2009, he announced his retirement from professional football.

Career statistics

Honours
Borussia Dortmund
 Bundesliga: 1994–95, 1995–96, 2001–02
 DFL-Supercup: 1995, 1996
 UEFA Champions League: 1996–97
 Intercontinental Cup: 1997

See also
List of one-club men

References

External links

1976 births
Living people
Footballers from Dortmund
German footballers
Association football midfielders
Bundesliga players
Borussia Dortmund players
Borussia Dortmund II players
Germany under-21 international footballers
Germany B international footballers
Germany international footballers
1999 FIFA Confederations Cup players
2002 FIFA World Cup players
UEFA Champions League winning players
Borussia Dortmund non-playing staff
West German footballers